was the art-name of a Japanese painter in the Nihonga style, active during the Taishō and early Shōwa eras.

Biography 
He was born on Sado island in Niigata Prefecture into a wealthy and influential family. His younger brother was the noted philosopher Tsuchida Kyōson (1891-1934). As an adolescent, Bakusen's father put him on the career path of a Buddhist priest, but he fled the temple where he was apprenticed in order to study art instead. He was accepted as a student by painter Takeuchi Seihō, and later studied at the Kyoto Kaiga Senmon Gakko (present day Kyoto City University of Arts) from which he graduated in 1911.

In 1918, Bakusen established a painting collective together with Murakami Kagaku, Ono Chikkyō, Sakakibara Shihō, and Nonagase Banka called the Kokuga Society (Kokuga Sōsaku Kyōkai, or "Society for the Creation of National Painting"), which was used as a vehicle to disseminate the group's eclectic style combining western yōga and Japanese (Nihonga) painting techniques and styles. His favorite subjects were women (bijinga), especially portraits of maiko, but he also painted flowers and still life themes. The Kokuga Society established its own annual exhibition, the Kokuten (abbreviation for "Kokuga Sōsaku Kyōkai Tenrankai") in competition with the increasingly restrictive Bunten Exhibitions in 1918. Seven Kokuten exhibitions were held between 1918 and 1928.

In 1921, the Kokuga Society went on hiatus when Bakusen traveled to Europe with Ono Chikkyō to tour Western art museums. They returned after a little more than a year, and resumed the Kokuga Society in 1923. Bakusen was particularly fond of French Impressionism and post-impressionism, especially the works of Paul Gauguin, Vincent van Gogh and Paul Cézanne, and collected several of their works while in Europe. The Kokuga Society broke up in 1928, due to financial difficulties and internal disagreements. In 1934, Bakusen was appointed to the Teikoku Bijutsuin (Imperial Art Academy). He died in June 1936 of pancreatic cancer. His grave is at the temple of Chishaku-in in Kyoto.

One of his works from 1918, now at the Tokyo National Museum of Modern Art is registered as an Important Cultural Property (ICP) by the Agency for Cultural Affairs. However, his painting  from 1923, owned by the same museum, is considered his masterpiece.

Philately 
One of Bakusen's works was selected as the subject of a commemorative postage stamp by the Japanese government:

 1979: Bugirinsen, commemorating the 1968 Philatelic Week

Noted works 

 , 1912, Tokyo National Museum of Modern Art 
 , 1918, Tokyo National Museum of Modern Art 
 , 1924, Tokyo National Museum of Modern Art 
 , 1927, Kyoto National Museum of Modern Art

References 

 Conant, Ellen P., Rimer, J. Thomas, Owyoung, Stephen. Nihonga: Transcending the Past: Japanese-Style Painting, 1868-1968. Weatherhill (1996). 
 Szostak, John D. Painting Circles: Tsuchida Bakusen and Nihonga Collectives in Early Twentieth Century Japan. Brill (2013).

External links 
 Biography and example from Adachi Art Museum

1887 births
1936 deaths
Kyoto City University of Arts alumni
Nihonga painters
People from Sado, Niigata
20th-century Japanese painters